Altermatt Lake is a lake in Brown County, Minnesota, in the United States. It is a protected public lake.

History
Altermatt Lake was named for John B. Altermatt, a Swiss settler. Treml Park
is bordered by 4000 feet of the lake's shoreline.

See also
 List of lakes of Minnesota
List of fishes of Minnesota

Bibliography
County Parks of Minnesota: 300 Parks You Can Visit Featuring 25 Favorites. Timothy J. Engrav

References

External links
Altermatt Lake Topographical map

Lakes of Minnesota
Lakes of Brown County, Minnesota